The team began play in 2006 as the Miami Valley Silverbacks, an expansion member of the American Indoor Football League (AIFL). On Saturday, March 25, 2006, WR/DB Maurice Lee managed to set five AIFL wide receiver records, en route to his team's 57–54 Week 5 road victory over the Steubenville Stampede. He set the records for most catches (16), most reception yards (191), most receiving touchdowns (7), most points (42), and total touchdowns (7). The team finished 5-9 in their expansion season, earning a birth in the AIFL playoffs before losing in the first round. After the season four Silverbacks were named to the AIFL ProStar Team.

Schedule

Standings

 Green indicates clinched playoff berth
 Purple indicates division champion
 Grey indicates best league record
 During regular season, all teams played within their conference.
 * = Filled in for games, due to Syracuse folding during the season. All three of these teams were outdoor amateur teams in the North American Football League.
 ** = Played remainder of Ghostriders road games, due to team folding during season.

References

American Indoor Football League
Dayton Sharks
2006 in sports in Ohio